Nils Lundh (21 January 1921 – 23 October 2005) was a Swedish ski jumper. He competed in the individual event at the 1948 Winter Olympics.

References

External links
 

1921 births
2005 deaths
Swedish male ski jumpers
Olympic ski jumpers of Sweden
Ski jumpers at the 1948 Winter Olympics
Sportspeople from Umeå